AKC Blauw-Wit (Amsterdamse Korfbal Club Blauw-Wit) is a Dutch korfball club located in Amsterdam, Netherlands. The club was founded on 6 December 1916 under the name of GOKC (Geheel Onthouders Korfbal Club) and they play their home games in the Blauw-Wit Hal. The team plays in white/blue horizontally striped shirts and black shorts / skirts.

History

Since the existence of the Korfbal League Blauw-Wit has been represented in the top division. Blauw-Wit reached the play-off stages 5 times in 2012, 2013, 2015, 2016 and 2017 but only in 2017 they reached to the final. Blauw-Wit is the only club from the capital to play in the highest korfball division.

Honours
 Dutch national champion outdoor, 14x (1933, 1936, 1937, 1938, 1949, 1953, 1954, 1964, 1968, 1969, 2001, 2010, 2013, 2017)
 Dutch national champion indoor, 3x (1969, 1979, 1980)
 Europacup champion outdoor,  2x (1968, 1969)
 Supercup champion outdoor, 2x (2013, 2017)

References

External links
 Blauw-Wit Official website

Korfball teams in the Netherlands